Punjabi literature, specifically literary works written in the Punjabi language, is characteristic of the historical Punjab of India and Pakistan and the Punjabi diaspora. The Punjabi language is written in several scripts, of which the Shahmukhi and Gurmukhī scripts are the most commonly used in Pakistan and India, respectively.

History

Early history
Hindu Nath Yogis were the first poets to use Punjabi language in praise of God. 
They referred to God with various names such as "Alakh Nirajan" which are still prevalent in Punjabi vernacular.

Medieval  
The Punjabi literary tradition is popularly seen to commence with Fariduddin Ganjshakar (1173–1266). whose Sufi poetry was compiled after his death in the Adi Granth.

Early modern period 

The Janamsakhis, stories on the life and legend of Guru Nanak (1469–1539), are early examples of Punjabi prose literature. Guru Nanak himself composed Punjabi verse incorporating vocabulary from Sanskrit, Arabic, Persian, and other South Asian languages as characteristic of the Gurbani tradition. Punjabi Sufi poetry developed under Shah Hussain (1538–1599), Sultan Bahu (1628–1691), Shah Sharaf (1640–1724), Ali Haider (1690–1785), Saleh Muhammad Safoori and Bulleh Shah (1680–1757). In contrast to Persian poets, who had preferred the ghazal for poetic expression, Punjabi Sufi poets tended to compose in the Kafi.

Punjabi Sufi poetry also influenced other Punjabi literary traditions particularly the Punjabi Qissa, a genre of romantic tragedy which also derived inspiration from Indic, Persian and Quranic sources. The Qissa of Heer Ranjha by Waris Shah (1706–1798) is among the most popular of Punjabi qisse. Other popular stories include Sohni Mahiwal by Fazal Shah, Mirza Sahiba by Hafiz Barkhudar (1658–1707), Sassi Punnun by Hashim Shah (1735?–1843?), and Qissa Puran Bhagat by Qadaryar (1802–1892).

Heroic ballads known as Vaar enjoy a rich oral tradition in Punjabi. Prominent examples of heroic or epic poetry include Guru Gobind Singh's in Chandi di Var (1666–1708). The semi-historical Nadir Shah Di Vaar by Najabat describes the invasion of India by Nadir Shah in 1739. The Jangnama, or 'War Chronicle,' was introduced into Punjabi literature during the Mughal period; the Punjabi Jangnama of Shah Mohammad (1780–1862) recounts the First Anglo-Sikh War of 1845–46.

Colonial period 

The Victorian novel, Elizabethan drama, free verse and Modernism entered Punjabi literature through the introduction of British education during the Raj. The first Punjabi printing press (using Gurmukhi font) was established through a Christian mission at Ludhiana in 1835, and the first Punjabi dictionary was published by Reverend J. Newton in 1854.

The Punjabi novel developed through Nanak Singh (1897–1971) and Vir Singh. Starting off as a pamphleteer and as part of the Singh Sabha Movement, Vir Singh wrote historical romance through such novels as Sundari, Satwant Kaur and Baba Naudh Singh, whereas Nanak Singh helped link the novel to the storytelling traditions of Qissa and oral tradition as well as to questions of social reform.

The novels, short stories and poetry of Amrita Pritam (1919–2005) highlighted, among other themes, the experience of women, and the Partition of India. Punjabi poetry during the British Raj moreover began to explore more the experiences of the common man and the poor through the work of Puran Singh (1881–1931). Other poets meanwhile, such as Dhani Ram Chatrik (1876–1957), Diwan Singh (1897–1944) and Ustad Daman (1911–1984), explored and expressed nationalism in their poetry during and after the Indian freedom movement. Chatrik's poetry, steeped in Indian traditions of romance and classical poetry, often celebrated varied moods of nature in his verse as well as feelings of patriotism. Brought up on English and American poetry, Puran Singh was also influenced by Freudian psychology in his oftentimes unabashedly sensuous poetry.

Modernism was also introduced into Punjabi poetry by Prof. Mohan Singh (1905–78) and Shareef Kunjahi. The Punjabi diaspora also began to emerge during the Raj and also produced poetry whose theme was revolt against British rule in Ghadar di Gunj (Echoes of Mutiny).

Post-Independence 
Western Punjab (Pakistan) 

Najm Hossein Syed, Fakhar Zaman and Afzal Ahsan Randhawa are some of the more prominent names in West Punjabi literature produced in Pakistan since 1947. Literary criticism in Punjabi has also emerged through the efforts of West Punjabi scholars and poets, Shafqat Tanvir Mirza, Ahmad Salim, and Najm Hosain Syed (b. 1936).

The work of Zaman and Randhawa often treats the rediscovery of Punjabi identity and language in Pakistan since 1947. Ali's short story collection Kahani Praga received the Waris Shah Memorial Award in 2005 from the Pakistan Academy of Letters. Mansha Yaad also received the Waris Shah Award for his collection Wagda Paani in 1987, and again in 1998 for his novel Tawan TawaN Tara, as well as the Tamgha-e-Imtiaz (Pride of Performance) in 2004.  The most critically successful writer in recent times has been Mir Tanha Yousafi who has won the Massod Khaddar Posh Trust Award 4 times, and has had his books transliterated into Gurmukhi for Indian Punjabi readers.

Urdu poets of the Punjab have also written Punjabi poetry including Munir Niazi (1928–2006). The poet who introduced new trends in Punjabi poetry is Pir Hadi abdul Mannan. Though a Punjabi poet, he also wrote poetry in Urdu. 

Ali Arshad Mir was an epic poet whose works gave voice to the voiceless - the downtrodden and the oppressed, his role is considered crucial in  20th century Punjabi literature.

Eastern Punjab (India) 

Amrita Pritam (1919–2005), Jaswant Singh Rahi (1930–1996), Shiv Kumar Batalvi (1936–1973), Surjit Patar (1944–) and Pash (1950–1988) are some of the more prominent poets and writers of East Punjab (India). Pritam's Sunehe (Messages) received the Sahitya Akademi in 1982. In it, Pritam explores the impact of social morality on women. Kumar's epic Luna (a dramatic retelling of the legend of Puran Bhagat) won the Sahitya Akademi Award in 1965. Socialist themes of revolution meanwhile influenced writers like Pash whose work demonstrates the influence of Pablo Neruda and Octavio Paz.

Punjabi fiction in modern times has explored themes in modernist and post-modernist literature. Punjabi culture. Moving from the propagation of Sikh thought and ideology to the themes of the Progressive Movement, the short story in Punjabi was taken up by Nanak Singh, Charan Singh Shaheed, Joshua Fazal Deen, and Heera Singh Dard. Women writers such as Ajit kaur and Daleep Kaur Tiwana meanwhile have questioned cultural patriarchy and the subordination of women in their work. Hardev Grewal has introduced a new genere to Punjabi fiction called Punjabi Murder Mystery in 2012 with his Punjabi novel "Eh Khudkushi Nahin Janab! Qatl Hai" (published by Lahore Books). Kulwant Singh Virk (1921-1987) won the Sahitya Akedemi award for his collection of short stories “Nave Lok” in 1967. His stories are gripping and provide deep insight into the rural and urban modern Punjab. He has been hailed as the “emperor of Punjabi short stories”.

Modern Punjab drama developed through Ishwar Nanda's Ibsen-influenced Suhag in 1913, and Gursharan Singh who helped popularize the genre through live theatre in Punjabi villages. Sant Singh Sekhon, Kartar Singh Duggal, and Balwant Gargi have written plays, with Atamjit has also been awarded the Sahitya Akademi Award in 2010 for his play Tatti Tawi De Vich.

Diaspora Punjabi literature 

Punjabi diaspora literature has developed through writers in the United Kingdom, Canada, Australia, and the United States, as well as writers in Africa such as Ajaib Kamal, born in 1932 in Kenya, and Mazhar Tirmazi, writer of famous song "Umraan Langhiyan Pabhan Bhaar." Themes explored by diaspora writers include the cross-cultural experience of Punjabi migrants, racial discrimination, exclusion, and assimilation, the experience of women in the diaspora, and spirituality in the modern world. Second generation writers of Punjabi ancestry such as Rupinderpal Singh Dhillon (writes under the name Roop Dhillon) have explored the relationship between British Punjabis and their immigrant parents as well as experiment with surrealism, science-fiction and crime-fiction. Bhupinder kaur Sadhaura (1971-)have biography of peer Budhu Shah Ji, book name is Guru Bhagat Peer Budhu Shah ( hanoured by Haryana Punjabi Sahitya Academy ). Other known writers include Sadhu Binning and Ajmer Rode (Canada), Mazhar Tirmazi, Amarjit Chandan, Avtar Singh Sandhu (Paash) (1950–1988)and Surjit Kalsi. The most successful writer has been Shivcharan Jaggi Kussa.

Genres 
Currently Punjabi writing can be split between the following genres
 Punjabi Qissa (Waris Shah)
 Traditional poetry (Surjit Paatar)
 Naxalite poetry (Paash, Amarjit Chandan)
 Lyrical poetry (Rajvinder Singh)
 Punjabi haiku (Amarjit Chandan)
 Yatharthvaad (Realism)
 Pachmi Paryatharvaad (Surreal, Fantasy, Imaginative) Roop Dhillon
 Parvasi (émigré) Sadhu Binning
 Viang (Satire) Jagjit Singh Komal

See also 

 List of Punjabi authors
 List of Punjabi language poets

References

External links 

Panjab Digital Library - houses digital versions of Punjabi manuscripts covering several centuries.
Punjabi Literature website - A collection of young and lesser known Panjabi Authors.

 
P
Literature by language
Pakistani literature